Luís Filipe Gomes Almeida (born 12 January 1991 in Lisbon), known as Kikas, is a Portuguese professional footballer who plays for C.F. Os Belenenses as a defensive midfielder.

References

External links
 

1991 births
Living people
Portuguese footballers
Footballers from Lisbon
Association football midfielders
Liga Portugal 2 players
Segunda Divisão players
Real S.C. players
Sporting CP B players
Leixões S.C. players
Casa Pia A.C. players
U.D. Leiria players
C.F. Os Belenenses players
Liga I players
FC Rapid București players
Segunda División B players
Recreativo de Huelva players
Portugal youth international footballers
Portuguese expatriate footballers
Expatriate footballers in Romania
Expatriate footballers in Spain
Portuguese expatriate sportspeople in Romania
Portuguese expatriate sportspeople in Spain